Jonnalagadda Venkata Somayajulu (30 July 1920 or  – 24 April 2004) was an Indian actor known for his works in Telugu cinema and a few Tamil, Malayalam, Kannada and Hindi films. In 1981, he received the Filmfare Award for Best Actor – Telugu for his work in the classic Sankarabharanam. On the centenary of Indian cinema, Forbes included his performance in the film among the 25 Greatest Acting Performances of Indian Cinema.

Some of the other films that earned Somayajulu a good reputation as an actor were Allari Pillalu, Nelavanka, Rowdy Alludu, Swathi Muthyam, Tyagayya, Saptapadi, Vijeta, Appula Appa Rao, Vamsa Vruksham and the Hindi film Jaag Utha Insan. He portrayed the guru character of Sri Raghavendra in the Tamil film Sri Raghavendrar. He made a 13-episode television serial based on the play Kanyasulkam. He also portrayed A.C. Bhaktivedanta Swami Prabhupada, in the biographical series Abhay Charan.

Personal life and career
Jonnalagadda Venkata Somayajulu was born in Lukalam Agraharam in Srikakulam district of present-day Andhra Pradesh. His father worked as an Inspector in the Prohibition and Excise department in Gudivada and other towns. He spent his childhood in Vizianagaram and also participated in stage dramas when he was in Vizianagaram. He was a government official and worked as a Deputy collector for Mahabub Nagar district.

His career spanned five decades in stage dramas, films and television. His passion for Gurazada Apparao's play, Kanyasulkam, was such that he, along with his actor brother J V Ramana Murthy, played it about 500 times in 45 years. His exposition of the delightfully notorious character, "Ramappanthulu" in the play, has become legendary. The woman behind the success of Somayajulu was his mother Saradamma. Somayajulu had two sons and a daughter.

Other works 
For the development of Telugu theatre in the twin cities Hyderabad and Secunderabad, Somayajulu established 'Rasaranjani' along with his contemporaries, Chatla Sriramulu, Garimella Rama Murthy and Rallapalli. Somayajulu worked in the Directorate of Cultural Affairs before retiring from government service.

Death 
Somayajulu died of heart attack in Hyderabad in 2004 at a reported age of 76.

Filmography

References

External links
 

Somayajulu, J.V
Somayajulu, J.V
Somayajulu, J.V
Male actors from Andhra Pradesh
Indian male stage actors
20th-century Indian male actors
21st-century Indian male actors
People from Srikakulam district
Male actors in Tamil cinema
Male actors in Telugu cinema
Indian male film actors
Male actors in Malayalam cinema
Male actors in Kannada cinema
Male actors in Hindi cinema
People from Uttarandhra